Aldemaro Romero (March 12, 1928 – September 15, 2007) was a Venezuelan pianist, composer, arranger and orchestral conductor. He was born in Valencia, Carabobo State.

Biography

Romero was a prolific composer, creating a wide range of music, such as Caribbean, Jazz, Venezuelan waltzes, including works for orchestra, orchestra and soloist, orchestra and choir, chamber music, and symphonic works. He began his musical studies with his father, Rafael Romero. In 1941, he moved to Caracas and worked as pianist in nocturnal saloons and dance orchestras. In 1949, he toured in Cuba, and then went to New York. In 1952, he returned to Caracas and established his own dance orchestra.

In 1951, Romero became an arranger at RCA Victor in New York. As a part of this contract, he released his record-breaking Dinner in Caracas album, the first of his Dinner In... series featuring popular Latin American music. In the United States, he collaborated with many musicians, including Dean Martin, Jerry Lee Lewis, Stan Kenton, René Touzent, Machito and Tito Puente. He also toured extensively, performing in various countries: Mexico, Puerto Rico, Colombia, Peru, Brazil, Argentina, Spain, France, Greece, Switzerland, Sweden, Italy, Russia, Egypt and Japan. Romero is considered the creator of the Venezuelan "New Wave" (Onda Nueva) genre, derived from the joropo and Brazilian Bossa Nova.
In the 1970s, Romero recorded in Italy La Onda Maxima (1972) and Onda Nueva Instrumental (1976) with bassist/arranger Pino Presti and drummer Tullio De Piscopo.

In addition to his work in popular music, Romero was also involved in concert music. He founded the Caracas Philharmonic Orchestra in 1979, and was its first conductor. He also guest conducted the London Symphony Orchestra, the English Chamber Orchestra, the National Radio Orchestra of Romania and the Royal Philharmonic Orchestra.

Personal life
He is the father of biologist Aldemaro Romero Jr.; Elaiza Romero, director of choir; and Ruby Romero de Issaev, producer and marketing director for Arts Ballet Theatre of Florida in the U.S.

Awards
Awards granted to Aldemaro Romero include:
 Peace Prize of the Soviet Intellectuals, Moscow Cinema Festival (Soundtrack for the Simón Bolivar epic film) (1969)
 First prize in the Majorca Palms Festival
 First prize in the Olympic Games Musical Festival in Greece
 First prize in the Latin Song Festival in Mexico
 Andrés Bello, Diego de Losada, Francisco de Miranda and the Work Merit orders from the Venezuelan Government 
 National Music Prize (2000)
 Honorary degrees from the University of Carabobo,  University of Zulia,  and Lisandro Alvarado University of Barquisimeto (2006)

Death
Aldemaro Romero died in Caracas on September 15, 2007, at the age of 79.

Discography

 Dinner in Caracas (1954)
 Dinner in Colombia (1956)
 Flight to Romance (1956)
 Venezuelan Fiesta (1956)
 Criollísima (1957)
 Almendra (1957)
 Sketches in Rhythm (1958)
 Venezuela (1958)
 El Garrasí (1959)
 La Onda Maxima (1972)
 Onda Nueva Instrumental (1976)

See also
 Aldemaro Romero en Maracaibo
 Venezuelan music
 Valses venezolanos, a compilation album made by Aldemaro Romero and his hall orchestra

References

External links
 Aldemaro Romero Discography
 

1928 births
2007 deaths
People from Caracas
People from Valencia, Venezuela
Venezuelan bandleaders
Venezuelan classical musicians
Venezuelan composers
Male composers
20th-century composers
Venezuelan conductors (music)
Male conductors (music)
Venezuelan folk musicians
Venezuelan jazz musicians
Venezuelan pianists
Venezuelan film score composers
Male film score composers
Venezuelan record producers
Latin jazz musicians
20th-century pianists
Male pianists
20th-century male musicians
Male jazz musicians